Contact is the third studio album by British indie soul group Noisettes, released in the United Kingdom on 26 August 2012 by Mono-ra-rama. The album includes the single "That Girl". The album peaked to number 30 on the UK Albums Chart.

Background
On 28 June 2012, the band announced that Contact was the name of their third album. Discussing the album, Shingai Shoniwa said: "The album starts with a big 30-piece orchestra and ends with just Dan and I singing and just the cackling of the wood and the flames of the fire for accompaniment." Dan Smith said: "Me and Shingai are a great double act in the studio [...] the trousers are on a rota. Sometimes I wear them and sometimes she does and occasionally we get a leg."

Critical reception
The album has so far been well received by critics. At Metacritic, which assigns a normalised rating out of 100 to reviews from mainstream critics, the album received an average score of 77, based on 9 reviews, which indicates "generally favourable reviews". Ally Carnwath of The Observer gave the album a positive review stating, "There's no volte-face here; chart-friendly electropop and retro soul predominate, and though there's variety in the mandolin strum of Rag Top Car and the title track's orchestral balladry, these are smooth gear changes rather than detours. Still, Shingai Shoniwa's vocals supply enough personality to elevate them above standard winebar fare." Caroline Sullivan of The Guardian gave the album a positive review, calling it a "frothfest of colour and light, with a joyous disregard for genre boundaries, but almost zilch in the way of introspection. [...] The eclecticism of a record that flits from trad country (Ragtop Car) to bossa nova (Star) and indie-disco [...] would feel a bit scattergun if Shoniwa and guitarist Dan Smith weren't so obviously fans of each style they tackle. This isn't one of those albums that diddles around with multiple genres solely in the hope of expanding a band's fanbase."

Singles
 "Winner" was released as buzz track from the album, which was available to download for free on their official Facebook page, in support of that year's GB Olympic team.
 "That Girl" was released as the lead single from the album on 12 August 2012. The song peaked to number 87 on the UK Singles Chart.

Track listing

Chart performance
On 2 September 2012, the album entered the UK Albums Chart at number 30. The album dropped to number 84 in its second week. The album also peaked to number 35 on the Scottish Albums Chart.

Charts

Release history

References

2012 albums
Noisettes albums
Albums produced by Jim Abbiss